SV Waldhof Mannheim is a multi-sports club, located in Mannheim, Baden-Württemberg. It is most known for its association football team; however, there are also professional handball and table-tennis sides. The club today has a membership of over 2,400.

History
The club was founded 1907 and played in the second division of the Westkreis-Liga before the First World War. Waldhof became part of the Kreisliga Odenwald in 1919 and won this league in 1920 and 1921. In each of those seasons, the club failed to advance in the Southern German championship because it was grouped with all-powerful 1. FC Nürnberg at the time. The club took a Bezirksliga Rhein championship in 1924 before joining the Bezirksliga Rhein-Saar in 1927, where it won five out of the next six division titles without ever performing particularly well in the Southern championship.

Its enjoyed its best performances in the Gauliga Baden, one of sixteen top-flight divisions established through the 1933 re-organization of German football under the Third Reich. Waldhof dominated the division through the 1930s and into the early 1940s, capturing the title five times. They were unable, however, to translate that into success at the national level. Their best result came in 1940 when they went out in a semi-final against FC Schalke 04, the dominant side of the era, before settling for fourth place after losing a consolation round match to Rapid Vienna.

After World War II, Waldhof competed in the Oberliga Süd, where they earned mid-table results until being relegated to the 2nd Oberliga Süd in 1954. They bounced up and down between first and second division play until the formation of the Bundesliga, Germany's new professional football league, in 1963. The next season saw them in the tier II Regionalliga Süd alongside local rivals VfR Mannheim. A string of unimpressive results finally led to relegation to the Amateurliga Nordbaden (III) in 1970.

Support from a new sponsor, the snack chip maker Chio, revived the team and helped their return to the second division where they played as SV Chio Waldhof Mannheim from 1972 to 1978. They continued to play as a middling side there until they broke through to the Bundesliga in 1983. Waldhof spent seven seasons in the top flight until a 17th-place finish saw the club relegated at the end of the 1989–90 season. They played for seven seasons as a 2. Bundesliga club until slipping to the Regionalliga Süd for two seasons in 1997–99. A merger with VfR Mannheim was considered in 1998 but the club walked away from a deal at the last minute. Their return to the 2. Bundesliga in 1999 after a season-long struggle with Kickers Offenbach was cut short in 2003 when financial irregularities saw the German Football Association deny the team a licence, dropping them to the Oberliga Baden-Württemberg (IV). Another attempt at a merger with VfR failed that same year. The club played in the Oberliga Baden-Württemberg until 2007–08, when a third-place finish allowed them to qualify for the Regionalliga.

After coming fourth in the Regionalliga Süd in 2008–09, the club moved to the Regionalliga West in 2009–10 to balance out the three Regionalligas.

Waldhof again had their licence withdrawn in 2010 and were demoted back to the Oberliga Baden-Württemberg, now the fifth level of German football, despite having finished clear of the relegation zone with the league's smallest budget. Waldhof spent only one year in the Oberliga, winning the league in 2010–11 and advancing directly back to the Regionalliga. On 11 June 2011 they defeated FV Illertissen 6–0 in their final league match to clinch promotion and also set a new fifth division attendance record of 18,312. It surpassed the previous record, the 2009 Leipzig derby, by more than 3,000 spectators.

At the end of the 2011–12, season the club was grouped into the new Regionalliga Südwest, which replaced the Regionalliga Süd in the region. Waldhof won the league in 2015–16 but lost to Sportfreunde Lotte in the promotion round. They also lost promotion play-offs in the following two seasons after finishing second in the Regionalliga Südwest, to Meppen on penalties in 2017 and to KFC Uerdingen in 2018 after crowd disturbances caused the second leg to be abandoned while Waldhof were losing 3–1 on aggregate. In the 2018–19 season, the team secured the Regionalliga Südwest championship and direct promotion to the 3. Liga on the 30th matchday with a 1–0 home win over Wormatia Worms.

Players

Current squad

Reserve team
The SV Waldhof II, historically also referred to as SV Waldhof Amateure, rose to the tier-IV league Verbandsliga Nordbaden in 1986 and remained there until gaining promotion to the Oberliga Baden-Württemberg in 2001. After two seasons in the Oberliga with good results, the team had to be withdrawn due to the forced relegation of the first team. In the 2007–08 season, the team narrowly missed out on Verbandsliga promotion when it finished second on equal points to the SV Sandhausen II.

Honours
The club's honours:

League
 Kreisliga Odenwald (I) 
 Champions: 1920, 1921
 Runners-up: 1922, 1923
 Bezirksliga Rhein (I) 
 Champions: 1924
 Bezirksliga Rhein-Saar (Rhein division) (I) 
 Champions: 1928, 1930, 1931, 1932, 1933
 Runners-up: 1929
 Gauliga Baden (I) 
 Champions: 1934, 1936, 1937, 1940, 1942
 Oberliga Süd (I) 
 Runners-up: 1947
 2. Bundesliga (II)
 Champions: 1983
 2. Oberliga Süd (II) 
 Champions: 1958, 1960
 Amateurliga Nordbaden (III) 
 Champions: 1971, 1972
 Verbandsliga Nordbaden
 Runners-up: 2000‡, 2001‡
 Landesliga Rhein/Neckar
 Runners-up: 2008‡, 2009‡
 Regionalliga Südwest (IV)
 Champions: 2016, 2019

Cup
 German Cup/DFB-Pokal
 Runners-up: 1939
 Baden Cup (Tiers III-VII)
 Winners: 1998, 1999, 2020, 2021, 2022

Youth
 German Under 19 championship
 Champions: 1980
 Runners-up: 1996

 ‡ Won by reserve team.

Recent managers
Recent managers of the club:

Recent seasons
The recent season-by-season performance of the club:

SV Waldhof Mannheim

SV Waldhof Mannheim II

 With the introduction of the Regionalligas in 1994 and the 3. Liga in 2008 as the new third tier, below the 2. Bundesliga, all leagues below dropped one tier.

Key

Rivals
Waldhof have a fierce rivalry with 1. FC Kaiserslautern. However, due to the league gap between the two sides, the rivalry was rarely competed until the 2019–20 season, where the two sides met for the first time in 22 years in the 3. Liga, the third tier of German football. Past meetings between the two have resulted in violence between the two sets of supporters, as well as between supporters and police. Another incident before a derby saw weapons seized by police.

Waldhof also share smaller rivalries with Kickers Offenbach and Mannheim city-rivals VfR Mannheim.

Stadium
SV Waldhof plays its home games at the Carl-Benz-Stadion, which holds 27,000 and opened in 1994.

References

External links

Abseits Guide to German Soccer
SV Waldhof Mannheim at Weltfussball.de
Das deutsche Fußball-Archiv historical German domestic league tables 

 
Football clubs in Germany
Football clubs in Baden-Württemberg
Association football clubs established in 1907
1907 establishments in Germany
Sport in Mannheim
Bundesliga clubs
2. Bundesliga clubs
3. Liga clubs